Craig Richards (born 10 October 1978) is a Welsh former rugby league and rugby union sevens player.

Playing career

Rugby union
Richards represented Wales in rugby sevens at the 2002 Commonwealth Games.

Rugby league
Richards played for the Crusaders in the National League Two for one season, in 2007. In May 2007, he tested positive to a metabolite of cocaine and was banned from the sport for two years. He returned to rugby league in 2010, playing one season with the South Wales Scorpions in the same competition.

References

1978 births
Living people
Crusaders Rugby League players
Rugby league players from Swansea
Rugby league wingers
Rugby union players from Swansea
South Wales Scorpions players
Rugby articles needing expert attention
Welsh rugby union players
Welsh rugby league players